Kaj Erik Persson Hassle (born 26 August 1988) is a Swedish pop singer and songwriter. His career started in 2008 with his first single, "Hurtful", which eventually reached No. 11 in Sweden and peaked at No. 2 in Denmark. His most successful single to date, "No Words", reached the Top 10 of the Global and U.S. Spotify Viral Chart and achieved Gold certification in both Sweden and Denmark.

Hassle, who signed to Island Records in 2009, has released four albums, most recently Innocence Lost in January 2017. Aside from solo work, he has cowritten a number of songs for other singers, including Shakira and Rihanna's "Can't Remember to Forget You". He won a Danish Gaffa award and two Swedish awards, a Grammis and a P3 Guld.

Saluted as "the new, young Robbie Williams" upon his international debut, Hassle has been described as "a voice steeped in simmering sultry soul, a funked-up sense of international swagger, and unbridled lyrical honesty."

Early life

Hassle was born in Salem Municipality, Stockholm. He was raised in the village of Bie near Katrineholm, where local musicians gathered in his parents' village theater. He grew up listening to Swedish punk and American soul and realised his love of music early after listening to Wilson Pickett. He was introduced to British New Wave at Rytmus, the musical secondary school in Stockholm attended by Robyn and Tove Lo (whom he would later support on her North American tour), where he met his manager at the age of 17. He signed a deal with the Swedish music company TEN Music Group in 2007, becoming their first signed artist. The label would later be credited with reviving Swedish pop music.

He was one of the finalists in the talent contest Metro Music Challenge in 2008. He wrote music and self-produced videos, spreading them online via X5 Music, YouTube and Myspace.

Music career

2008–2010: First releases and recognition 
Hassle released his first single, "Hurtful", in September 2008. It would become a sleeper hit over the years, eventually reaching No. 11 in his native Sweden and peaking at No. 2 in Denmark.

In March 2009, when he did not have an album out yet, Hassle signed for Island Records in London for worldwide rights excluding North America and Sweden, where the Swedish label Roxy Recordings had already signed Hassle for two albums. The Guardian picked up the story, calling him "the Stockholm wunderkind," comparing him to Frankmusik, Keane and Ross Copperman, and wondering if he was "the new, young Robbie Williams." In August, he published his album Hassle, which debuted at No. 2 and stayed in the Swedish charts for 10 weeks. He immediately released his second single, "Don't Bring Flowers", which peaked at No. 25 in Sweden.

Together with Ellie Goulding, Hassle released an acoustic version of Robyn's "Be Mine!". In late 2009 he embarked on touring outside of Sweden and released "Hurtful" in the UK on 2 February 2010. It debuted at No. 59 and fell off the charts the following week. He reworked and re-released his debut album as Pieces in the UK. It failed to chart in the UK Albums Chart. The album's lack of success was later described as "the greatest pop injustice of the last several years." Popjustice placed it at No. 11 of its top albums of 2009.

On 19 January 2010, Hassle appeared at the Danish X Factor finals and the P3 Guld gala, where he was awarded the prize for "Newcomer of the Year 2009". He won the Newcomer Prize at the Swedish Grammis in the same year. Finally, he won the 2010 Danish Gaffa Prize for the International Newcomer of the Year. He toured with Mika, Broods, and MØ.

In May 2010, "Hurtful" was picked as Single of the Week in iTunes Store. In August, Hassle released an extended play (EP) entitled The Hassle Sessions: Volume One, consisting of cover songs. His English version of the single "Alors on danse" by Stromae was made available through Spotify.

2011–2014: Songwriting success 
The mini-album Mariefred Sessions was the result of a collaboration between Erik Hassle and Joakim Berg and Martin Sköld from the Swedish band Kent. Mariefred Sessions was released in Sweden on 23 March 2011. Hassle moved to Los Angeles in 2013.

Hassle was a co-writer for Shakira's single "Can't Remember to Forget You" featuring Rihanna. It released worldwide in January 2014 and reached top ten charts in various countries such as Spain, France, Germany, and Switzerland. The single also debuted in the U.S. at number 15 on the Billboard Hot 100 chart. It was the first official track written by Hassle and sung by another artist.

Hassle released his next EP, entitled Somebody's Party, via TEN Music Group and RCA Records on 4 March 2014 after a two-year hiatus. The EP was a collection of 6 tracks heavily influenced by R&B. Hassle released "Talk About It," featuring Chicago based rapper Vic Mensa, as his comeback single. Other featured artists on the EP included Tinashe in the song "Innocence Lost." The EP was inspired by the hardships of being in a relationship and Erik's own personal heartbreak.

2015–2016: "No Words" and collaborations 
While visiting his home country, Sweden, Hassle began working on "No Words." In an interview with Billboard Magazine, Hassle shared that he wrote the song while experiencing a heartbreak. The single was released in April 2015 and received additional publicity when it headed off Taylor Swift's list of "Songs that would Make your Life more Awesome". "No Words" went viral, reaching the Top 10 of the Global and U.S. Spotify Viral Chart and achieving Gold certification in both Sweden and Denmark. It was described as "an uptempo, disco-tinged confection of sighing strings and funk guitar" and hailed as "a return to Hassle's unabashed melodic melancholia." In October, Erik Hassle peaked at number 14 on Billboard's Next Big Sound.

Hassle co-wrote and provided vocals for the single "Emergency" by fellow label mates and Swedish pop-duo Icona Pop. The single was officially released in May 2015, reached the number one spot in the U.S. Dance Club Songs, and was featured in FIFA 16. He toured across North America supporting Twin Shadow.

Over the years, Hassle collaborated with many artists, including Groundislava on his single "Flatline", Broderick Batts on "¯\_(ツ)_/¯", Kungs on Omi's "Midnight Serenade", Gorgon City on "FTPA", Bondax on "Love Me Blind", and Snakehips on "Cruel".

2017: Innocence Lost
Hassle released the album "Innocence Lost" via TEN Music Group and RCA Records on 27 January 2017. The 12-track album includes the single "Missing You" produced by John Hill. The LP was executively produced by Daniel Ledinsky and features the guest vocals of Tinashe and Vic Mensa, producers Eshraque "iSHi" Mughal and Dave Sitek, with additional production from SOHN, Oskar "Sikow" Engstroem, Billboard, Gorgon City and Al Shux.

Hassle's singing has been compared to Michael Jackson, Prince, and Frank Ocean. He has been described as "a huskier-voiced Justin Timberlake singing over The Knocks’ choicest beats."

Personal life

Hassle's mother is a singer and his father is a studio owner. He has three brothers and two sisters.

Discography

Albums

Extended plays

Singles

Notable guest appearances

Songwriting credits

Music videos

Awards
 2010 Danish GAFFA-priset – International Newcomer of the Year
 2009 Swedish Grammis – Newcomer of the Year
 2009 Swedish P3 Guld – Newcomer of the Year

Notes

References

External links
 Official website The official website
 Erik Hassle fan Street Team Erik Hassle fan Street Team

1988 births
Living people
English-language singers from Sweden
21st-century Swedish singers